Faverolles is a commune in the Aisne department in Hauts-de-France in northern France.

Literature
Faverolles is the village in which the protagonist of Victor Hugo's Les Misérables, Jean Valjean lived before he was arrested.

Here is a quote from Victor Hugo's novel:

"Jean Valjean came from a poor peasant family of Brie. He had not learned to read in his childhood. When he reached man's estate, he became a tree-pruner at Faverolles."

The village of Faverolles is situated in the Department of Aisne, in the region of Hauts-de-France, in the country of France. An area of the department of Aisne was historically part of the  region of Brie. This northern part of Brie was also called 'Brie pouilleuse'.

Population

See also
Communes of the Aisne department

References

Communes of Aisne
Aisne communes articles needing translation from French Wikipedia